There are twelve towns in Luxembourg, as defined by statute. Despite the status as towns, they are not all contiguous urbanised areas.  They are similar to communes, but have been given a separate legal status.  There is a technical difference between the status of commune and towns, but this is limited in practicality.  One difference is that échevins in towns are formally appointed by the Grand Duke, whereas échevins for other communes are appointed by the Minister for the Interior.

Terminology 
The officially used terms for a town in the sense of this article are Stad (plural Stied) in Luxembourgish, Stadt (plural Städte) in German, and ville (plural villes) in French.

All of these terms may be translated as either "town" or "city". However, apart from the capital, Luxembourg, and Esch-sur-Alzette, most of the places have none of the qualities that would award them the status of a "city" according to English usage.

History 
Historically, this status was derived from a town's possession of a town charter, but town rights are now granted and regulated by statute.  In the modern era, the status was first conferred on 24 February 1843, when seven of the eight towns that had previously been granted charters were reinstated as towns (Clervaux was not).  They were (in the order given in the law): Luxembourg City, Diekirch, Grevenmacher, Echternach, Wiltz, Vianden, and Remich.

For over sixty years, no more towns were added, but the vast demographic shift during the last part of the nineteenth century made it impossible to leave the arrangements unchanged.  Thus, on 29 May 1906, Esch-sur-Alzette was promoted; Esch was followed by Differdange, Dudelange, Ettelbruck, and Rumelange on 4 August 1907.  An area of the (now extinct) commune of Hollerich was conferred the title on 7 April 1914, under the title of 'Hollerich-Bonnevoie'; this status was lost when Hollerich was merged into Luxembourg City on 26 March 1920.

The last such statute affecting town status in Luxembourg was the Loi communale du 13 décembre 1988.  In the order outlined in that legislation (i.e. alphabetical, except with Luxembourg City first), the twelve communes with town status are: Luxembourg City, Diekirch, Differdange, Dudelange, Echternach, Esch-sur-Alzette, Ettelbruck, Grevenmacher, Remich, Rumelange, Vianden, and Wiltz.

In spite of their town status, some of the municipalities are very small and more like villages than towns. There are also municipalities without town status that have more inhabitants than some of the official towns (especially in the Luxembourg and Red Lands agglomerations, but also elsewhere, such as Mersch). Apart from the capital, Luxembourg, which is a city with now over 110,000 inhabitants, only the three or five next largest municipalities (Esch-sur-Alzette, Differdange, Dudelange, plus possibly Ettelbruck and Diekirch) have long been urbanised enough to be described as towns. However, most municipalities are now growing with the continuously high figures of immigration to Luxembourg. There is a town planning project that aims at developing Ettelbruck, Diekirch and four bordering municipalities into a new centre called Nordstad ("North Town") with an expected population of 30,000.

List of towns

See also
 List of villages in Luxembourg

Footnotes

Luxembourg, List of cities in
Towns